Hyun Jin Kim  (born 1982) is an Australian academic, scholar and author.

He was born in Seoul and raised in Auckland, New Zealand. Kim got his Doctor of Philosophy degree from the University of Oxford. He started learning Latin, German, and French when he was 10, and was urged to study Ancient Greek in university by his father.
He is a scholar of ancient Greece, Rome and China. Kim has published several works on Eurasian/ Central Asian peoples, such as the Huns. In 2019, Kim was elected a Fellow of the Australian Academy of the Humanities.

His work focuses chiefly on comparative analyses of ancient Greece/Rome and China. His first major work on such topic was Ethnicity and Foreigners in Ancient Greece and China, published in 2009.

Selected list of works
 Kim, Hyun Jin (2009). Ethnicity and Foreigners in Ancient Greece and China. London: Duckworth Books. .
 Kim, Hyun Jin (2013). The Huns, Rome and the Birth of Europe. Cambridge: Cambridge University Press. .
 Kim, Hyun Jin (2016). The Huns.  Abingdon-on-Thames: Taylor & Francis. .
 Kim, Hyun Jin (2017). Eurasian Empires in Antiquity and the Early Middle Ages: Contact and Exchange Between the Graeco-Roman World, Inner Asia and China.  Cambridge: Cambridge University Press. .
 Kim, Hyun Jin (2018). Geopolitics in Late Antiquity: The Fate of Superpowers from China to Rome. Abingdon-on-Thames: Taylor & Francis. .
 Kim, Hyun Jin; Lieu, Samuel N.C.; McLaughlin, Raoul (2021). Rome and China Points of Contact. Abingdon-on-Thames: Taylor & Francis. .
 Cha, Hyeonji; Kim, Hyun Jin (2022). South Korea's Origins and Early Relations with the United States: The Lynchpin of Hegemonic Power. Abingdon-on-Thames: Taylor & Francis. .

References

Living people
21st-century Australian historians
Australian scholars
Australian sinologists
University of Melbourne
1982 births
Australian people of Korean descent
People from Seoul
Fellows of the Australian Academy of the Humanities